Acura is the luxury and performance division of Japanese automaker Honda, based primarily in North America. The brand was launched in the United States on March 27, 1986, marketing luxury and performance automobiles. It was introduced to Canada on February 14, 1987, Hong Kong in 1991 (lasting until 2009), Mexico in 2004, China in 2006 (until 2023), Russia in 2014 (until 2016), Panama in 2014, Kuwait in 2015, and was also sold in Ukraine in 2006 (until 2018). Honda's plan to introduce Acura to the Japanese domestic market (JDM) in 2008 was delayed, due to economic reasons, and later withheld as a result of the financial crisis of 2007–2008.

Acura was the first luxury division established by a Japanese automaker. The creation of Acura coincided with the introduction of a JDM Honda dealership sales channel, called Honda Clio, which sold luxury vehicles, joining previously established Honda Verno, followed by Honda Primo the following year. In its first few years of existence, Acura was among the best-selling luxury marques in the US, outselling established brands such as BMW and Mercedes-Benz. Though sales were down in the mid-to-late 1990s, the brand experienced a revival in the early 2000s, due to drastic redesigns and the introductions of new models.

In the late 1980s, the success of the company's first flagship vehicle, the Legend, inspired fellow Japanese automakers Toyota and Nissan to launch their own luxury brands, Lexus and Infiniti, respectively. The 1990 launch of the NSX, a mid-engine exotic sports car, offered a reliable and practical alternative to exotic European sports cars, and introduced Honda's VTEC variable valve timing system to the North American market. The 1993 Legend coupé featured Acura's first use of a six-speed manual transmission mated to a Type II engine. In the late 1990s, Acura produced a Type R version of its compact Integra, which featured a reduced curb weight, a stiffer and lower suspension, and a high-output VTEC engine.

In the early 2000s, Acura introduced new models, including the company's first all-original SUV, the MDX, and two models which replaced the Integra coupé and sedan, the RSX and TSX, respectively. Type-S versions of the RSX, CL, and TL were added to the brand's lineup during that decade. Acura's 2005 RL flagship introduced SH-AWD, a torque-vectoring all-wheel drive system. The 2007 RDX, a crossover SUV, featured the first North American use of a turbocharged Honda engine. A second generation NSX was launched in 2016 and features a twin-turbocharged mid-engine, a nine-speed dual-clutch transmission, and Sport Hybrid SH-AWD.

Etymology and logo 
The Acura name is derived from the Latin “acu,” meaning mechanically precise or done with precision. The logo is derived from the caliper, a precise design tool representing the meticulous attention to detail that goes into every car.

History

1980s
The brand was created around the same time as Japanese rivals Nissan and Toyota developed their respective Infiniti and Lexus premium brands. The Japanese government imposed voluntary export restraints for the U.S. market, so it was more profitable for Japanese automakers to export more expensive cars to the U.S.

Following a decade of research, Honda opened 60 new dealerships in North America by 1986, to support its Acura automobile division. Acura was the first Japanese luxury brand, introduced under the slogan, "Acura. Precision Crafted Automobiles." Its initial offering consisted of two models: the executive class Legend and the compact class Integra, available as a five-door and three-door hatchback. The Legend was the result of Project XX, a joint venture Honda entered into with the UK's Austin Rover Group. It was mechanically related to the Rover 800 series, while the Integra was an improvement of the Honda Quint hatchback.

The success of these models, particularly the Legend, led to competing Japanese luxury brand ventures (Toyota's Lexus that began development in 1983 as the F1 project, and Nissan's Infiniti who began development in 1985 by revising their Japan-only flagship Nissan President; in the late 1990s Mazda planned but never launched its own Amati luxury division). The goal of the Legend was to compete with rivals Toyota Crown and the Nissan Cedric and Gloria, but due to its 1986 introduction worldwide, Toyota, Nissan and other companies like Lincoln took notice of the markets reaction to the Legend and later the Vigor and offered vehicles that addressed the executive size car. Toyota introduced the Lexus ES, Nissan introduced the Infiniti J30 and Ford utilized the Taurus platform and named their new sedan the Lincoln Continental.

In 1987, Acura's first full year of sales, they sold 109,000 cars with the flagship Legend sedan accounting for 55,000 sales and the rest were of the smaller Integra. By 1990, Acura was selling 138,000 vehicles, including 54,000 Legends, compared to Mercedes-Benz's 78,000 cars and 64,000 each for BMW and Lexus.

1990s
In 1990, five years after the debut of the Legend and Integra, Acura introduced the NSX, a midship V6 powered, rear-wheel-drive sports car.  The NSX, an acronym for "New Sports eXperimental", was billed as the first Japanese car capable of competing with Ferrari and Porsche. This vehicle served as an "image car" for both the Honda and Acura brands, heralding the introduction of Honda's VTEC technology. The NSX was the world's first all-aluminum production car, and was also marketed and viewed by some as the "everyday supercar" thanks in part to its ease of use, quality and reliability, traits that were unheard of in the supercar segment at the time. With the release of the NSX, Acura introduced the "A-badge", a stylized pair of calipers—a tool used for exacting measurements to imply that Acura vehicles are built to precise and demanding standards.

Despite a strong start in market acceptance for the Acura brand, sales suffered in the mid-to-late 1990s.  Some critics attributed this decline in part to less inspiring designs, which were re-branded Japanese-spec Hondas, such as the Acura Vigor in 1992. Additionally, during this time Acura switched to an alphanumeric nomenclature formula, dropping the Legend, Vigor and Integra titles, following the lead of the NSX sportscar. The 1996 3.5 RL, which replaced the popular Legend, and the Vigor became the 2.5 TL and 3.2 TL, and was regarded by many as the epitome of this problem, namely because the alphanumeric designations were more anonymous than the former Legend, Vigor and Integra titles, which had grown into their own cult followings.

The parent company, Honda, was also feeling the results of the decline of the Japanese economy, due to the Japanese asset price bubble that took place during the 1990s and into the 2000s. This period is known in Japan as The Lost Decade.

During this time, the NSX also lost sales as Acura made few changes from its original 1990 trim. A year later, the Integra sedan was withdrawn from the Canadian market, replaced by the market-exclusive Acura 1.6 EL, a rebadged Honda Civic/Domani. The Integra sedan continued to be sold in the United States until 2001 (in name only, the model it was replaced with, the RSX, was simply a rebadged left-hand-drive version of the JDM DC5 Honda Integra).

Despite these letdowns, Acura gained prominence in the 1990s with a young group of customers: "tuner" enthusiasts.  Parent company Honda's reputation with this demographic as a maker of "easy-to-tune" and "rev-happy" engines rubbed off onto Acura, and the Integra became a popular tuner car.

2000–2003

Beginning around the year 2000, Acura experienced a rebirth which was catalyzed by the introduction of several redesigned models. The first of these models was the 1999 Acura 3.2 TL, an upscale sedan. Critics suggested that although 3.2 TL did not outdo its competition in any one area of luxury cars, it offered a well-rounded blend of sportiness and luxury. These characteristics, combined with the TL's competitive price, proved very popular with consumers. Subsequent Acura models have followed a similar philosophy of offering much standard equipment and few options.

Another refreshed Acura introduced in the early 2000s was the MDX, a popular three-row crossover SUV based on the Honda Odyssey minivan. The MDX replaced the slow-selling SLX, which was little more than a rebadged Isuzu Trooper. The MDX was a car-like crossover SUV with limited off-road capability that catered to the demands of the luxury SUV market. It was given top honors by Car and Driver in its first comparison test against seven other SUVs. Other cars in Acura's line-up during this time included the 3.2 TL, 3.2 CL, RSX (formerly the Integra hatchback), and the NSX. By the late 2000s, Acura had dropped the inclusion of engine displacement numbers in its vehicle designations, retaining a simpler, two- or three-letter designation instead (e.g. 3.5 RL became RL). The 1999-2003 TL have been plagued by transmission and other problems.

In 2001, a new coupe, badged as the RSX was introduced to the Acura line up. It was a replacement for the outgoing Integra. The RSX is a rebadged Honda Integra (DC5) from the Japanese market. As a result, the RSX is technically a new generation of the outgoing Integra. Much like the Integra, the RSX was a hit in the tuner market. However, at the end of 2006, the RSX was taken out of the Acura line up, subsequently in the Japanese market as well. It is not known why the RSX did not continue to be sold as the Integra in Japan, however, the reason that Acura gave for the cancellation of the RSX is that Acura wishes to move up in the luxury brand, thus cannot sell a car that is mostly driven by teenagers.

2004–2006
A new TL was introduced for the 2004 model year, with a  V6  measured by the then-current SAE standards. The new TL increased sales dramatically to 70,943 American units in 2005.

Also around the same time the Acura TSX was introduced. It was essentially a re-badged European and Japanese market Honda Accord loaded with features. This model became the only 4-cylinder sedan in Acura's line-up (with the exception of the Canadian market Acura CSX, which replaced the EL in 2006).

In 2005, a new RL was introduced with a  V6, improved styling, and Super Handling All-Wheel Drive (SH-AWD), a system capable of sending almost all of the RL's power to just one wheel in a turn. The second-generation RL appeared on Car and Driver'''s Ten Best list for 2005, and also garnered an CNET.com "Editor's Choice" When the RL was introduced, it did not perceive Acura as being on par with its German rivals and expected more value from the Japanese marque. The damage from Honda Japan's alleged hubris was done, even though Honda Canada has since reduced the RL's price.

Acura's new models—particularly the TL and TSX—were well received by the motoring press and became Acura's top selling vehicles by then. The TSX was on Car and Driver's Ten Best list from 2004 to 2006.

In 2006 Acura introduced a small SUV which was based on its own unique unibody chassis called the RDX with models becoming available to U.S. consumers in August 2006. It is powered by a turbocharged 240-hp 4-cylinder engine and, like the RL, uses Acura's SH-AWD system. A completely redesigned MDX became available in the fall of 2006 with a  V6 engine and Super Handling All-Wheel Drive.

2007–2013

Acura re-introduced the TL Type-S for the 2007 model year. 2009 marked the all new TL and TSX models as well as a mid-year model update for the RL; all three made their debuts in the 2008 calendar year. Acura planned on redesigning the RL by 2011 as well as announced the creation of a brand new luxury crossover vehicle called the ZDX, previewed by the concept of the same name.

The ZDX was the first Acura designed in Acura's design studio located at Torrance in Southern California. The ZDX was designed by Michelle Christensen and based on the Acura MDX using that vehicles 3.7 litre V6 engine (300 bhp) and SH-AWD system. It is also the first Acura to be completely built in North America. The production model of the ZDX made its debut in the Orange County Auto Show in Southern California on 15 October 2009. The concept behind the ZDX is that it is a "four door coupe," and the design emphasis of the body of the car is like a "pulled back slingshot." Another prominent design aspect of the ZDX is the wide rear shoulders above the rear wheels. The ZDX went on sale in December 2009.

Acura initially had plans for the third generation of RL to be a rear wheel drive V8 sedan for its flagship, but shelved the plans in the wake of the 2008 economic downturn.

Acura announced new TSX wagon in the 2010 New York Auto Show and went on sale in Fall of 2010. The wagon version of the TSX is based on the wagon version of the Euro-spec Honda Accord which has been in the European market for some time. However, Acura did not announce any plans for the third-generation RL.

For the 2010 model year the MDX models received some slight exterior changes and increased equipment levels. Mechanically the engine remained unchanged but the transmission was updated from the previous 5-speeds to 6-speeds including steering column mounted shift override paddles. This new transmission was shared with the ZDX.

In 2012, Acura introduced a new model called the ILX which replaced the Acura CSX in Canada and is based on the Honda Civic platform. The ILX was initially offered with three powertrain options: a 1.5L four cylinder electric hybrid shared with the North American Honda Civic Hybrid paired to a CVT transmission, a 2.0L 4 cylinder R20A1 paired to a 5 speed automatic transmission, or a 2.4L K24Z7 paired with a 6 speed manual transmission equipped with a limited slip differential identical to the 2013-2015 Honda Civic Si. It also unveiled the Acura RLX Concept, a replacement for the RL sedan, at the New York International Auto Show. The ILX went on sale in May 2012 in the United States as a 2013 model.

Also in 2012, Acura "reinvented" another model, The RDX concept. For the new model, Acura dropped the 4 cylinder turbo for a 3.5L V6. When the official 2013 Acura RDX was released, it was relatively similar to the concept but had changes in wheels, taillights, and some other cosmetics. A lot of this Acura looks like its brother the ILX. The 2013 RDX doesn't have the SH-AWD system instead it has "AWD with intelligent control", similar to the CR-V's AWD system.

In 2013, Acura showed a 2014 Concept of the MDX. Shortly after, it was released to the public. The MDX competes with the Lexus RX, Audi Q7, and many others.

In December 2013, at the Los Angeles Auto Show, Acura unveiled a Sport Hybrid SH-AWD version of the flagship RLX sedan. It has a 310-horsepower 3.5L V6 engine and a pair of electric motors (one for each axle) that generate a combined 377 horsepower through a new 7-speed dual clutch transmission. Acura technology firsts on the 2014 RLX Sport Hybrid SH-AWD also include an electronic gear selector that replaces the conventional, center console-mounted shift lever with an efficiently packaged push-button array allowing the driver to easily select the desired mode—Park, Drive and Reverse, as well as Sport and Normal driving modes. The new RLX Sport Hybrid will go on sale in mid-2014.

2014–present
In January 2014, at the Detroit Auto Show, Acura unveiled the all-new 2015 TLX sports sedan. This new vehicle replaced the soon to be discontinued TSX and TL sedans. The TLX in the 2.4-liter comes with Acura's all new eight-speed dual clutch DCT transmission. Meanwhile, the high-end 3.5-liter V6 model came with the new nine-speed transmission and Super-Handling All Wheel Drive (SH-AWD). The TLX went on sale in the Summer of 2014.

In 2015, Acura redesigned the ILX for the 2016 model year. Now solely available with a 2.4L K24V7 engine and 8-speed dual clutch transmission (DCT) instead of the 2.0L R20A1 & 5-speed automatic transmission, 2.4L K24Z7 6 speed manual transmission and hybrid electric options. Added is the signature Acura Jewel Eye LED headlights, LED taillights, updated wheels, suspension modifications, bumper redesign, and new packages such as AcuraWatch Package (includes adaptive cruise control, collision mitigation, lane keeping assist system, road departure mitigation, and forward collision warning) and A-Spec (sportier appearance).

Also redesigned is the 2016 RDX. Featured with the same 3.5L 6-speed automatic with some slight adjustments for efficiency and hp/torque boosts. The RDX gets the Acura Jewel Eye LED treatment as well. A new Advance Package is being offered with the inclusion of, parking sensors (front and rear), rain-sensing windshield wipers, auto-dimming side mirrors, remote start, ventilated seats, and foglights.

In 2017, Acura made considerations on opening an Indian branch.

Racing
Almost since its inception, Acura has been involved in American motorsports, specifically in Sports Car Club of America (SCCA) and IMSA GT Championship series.  Starting in 1991, Acura reached an agreement with Comptech Racing to use the V6 motor of the Acura NSX in Comptech's Camel Lights Spice prototype.  Acura would go on to take the Lights championship in its initial year, including a class win at the 24 Hours of Daytona.  Acura and Comptech would take the Lights championships again in 1992 and 1993, as well as another Daytona class win in 1992 and a class win at the 12 Hours of Sebring for 1993.

However a change in the IMSA rules would lead to the demise of the Camel Lights, and so Acura moved to touring car racing, joining Realtime Racing in the SCCA World Challenge with the NSX in 1996, winning the final two races of the season.  In 1997, Acura added Acura Integras to the lower classes, and were successful in taking the championship in both of these classes.  Realtime took the touring championship with the Integra again in 1998, and came within a few points of winning it again in 1999 only to lose it in the final race, then coming back to retake the title in 2000.

Although Realtime had abandoned the NSX program in 1998, the NSXs returned to the top class in 2001.  Although the NSX squad suffered mechanical woes and were unable to take the title, the Integras of the touring class once again took the teams championship.  By 2002, Acura replaced the aged Integra with the new Acura RSX in the final races of the season, scoring good finishes in their debut.  At the same time, Acura finally retired the NSXs from the top GT class.  The RSXs would later be joined by new Acura TSXs in 2004.  Realtime continues to campaign the RSX and TSX in the SCCA Speed World Challenge.  Acura also currently races RSXs and TSXs in the Grand American Road Racing Association's KONI Challenge Series for touring cars.

At the Detroit Auto Show in 2006, Acura announced their plans to enter the American Le Mans Series with multiple teams of Le Mans prototypes in the LMP2 class starting in 2007 season.  The cars would be purchased chassis from existing manufacturers, but use American-built Acura V8s (a first for Acura and Honda).  Acura also announced their initiative to take the cars to the 24 Hours of Le Mans in 2008 and eventually move to the superior LMP1 class with cars built by Acura themselves in 2009.  Later in 2006, Acura announced that the three factory teams would be Andretti Green Racing, Fernández Racing, and Highcroft Racing, and that the chassis would be built by Lola Cars of the UK and Courage Compétition of France.

The three Acura-powered prototypes debuted at the 2007 12 Hours of Sebring, which was the opening round of the ALMS season, and were successful in their debut.  Andretti Green's Acura took second place overall and first in the LMP2 class, while Fernández Racing took third overall, and Highcroft sixth, beating a series of established Porsche teams in their class. At the same time, Acura began development of their own chassis by heavily modifying their purchased Courage chassis.  The cars now have been so radically changed from their original orientation that they are now named Acura ARX-01a.  Acura will introduce evolved B-spec cars in the 2008 season, with Gil de Ferran launching a fourth Acura team in the ALMS.

In 2009, Acura produced its very first LMP1 car, the Acura ARX-02a.

In 2010, Honda rebadged all Acura prototypes as Honda Performance Development (HPD) cars, and announced that all future prototypes (such as the HPD ARX-03) would be constructed under the HPD name.

Acura did not participate in motorsports again until 2013, where two Acura ILXs were unofficially entered in the 25 Hours of Thunderhill by Honda R&D Americas designers and engineers (Team Honda Research West). The car would retire from the race due to engine problems.

The Acura ILXs returned to Thunderhill for the 2014 25-hour race. This time the car won its class and finished 8th overall. At the 2016 New York International Auto Show, Acura announced the GT3 version of the NSX, which began competition in 2017 with factory support in both WeatherTech SportsCar Championship's GTD class and Pirelli World Challenge GT class, the latter replacing the Acura TLX. The car competes under Honda branding outside North America.

Marketing

The Acura logo, introduced in 1990 for the 1991 model year, is, according to Honda, a caliper — a design tool used for measuring that can also be interpreted as a skewed "H" (for Honda) or a stylised "A" (for Acura). The logo that was originally authorized without approval by Soichiro Honda did not contain the small horizontal bar joining the two vertical pillars—thus, it did not form the letter "H". Soichiro Honda ordered the 5,000 badges already produced to be destroyed, including prying off the emblems applied to 309 cars already (US-spec Integra, Legend, and NSX models).

Acura's current marketing slogan is "Precision Crafted Performance."Advance.  Acura.com. Accessed on 24 October 2011. Recent models include Technology, Advance, Type-S, SH-AWD and A-Spec trim levels. Technology and Advance models typically come with the latest hi-tech features such as keyless start and a blind spot information system. Type-S and SH-AWD models are performance-oriented, with a substantial increase in horsepower compared to the lower trim levels. Some models, such as the TL, also combine trim levels (i.e. "SH-AWD with Advance").

Acura began an association with Marvel Entertainment in 2010, upon release of the film Iron Man 2, which featured a ZDX after the ending credits. On 20 April 2011, Acura and Marvel announced a promotional campaign, making Acura the official brand of Marvel's fictional S.H.I.E.L.D. organization. Soon thereafter, several Acura models—such as the MDX, ZDX, RL, and TL—appeared in the films Thor and Captain America: The First Avenger. In the 2012 film, The Avengers'', Iron Man (played by Robert Downey Jr.) drove an exotic sportscar by Acura, made specifically for the film, rather than the Audi R8 he previously drove. It was rumored that the car spotted during filming was a concept for the second generation NSX, however, a different-looking 2012 Acura NSX Concept was unveiled at the North American International Auto Show, on 9 January 2012.

From 1995 to 2007, Acura sponsored two WTA Tour tennis tournaments, both named the Acura Classic.

In 2012, Acura was the presenting sponsor and official vehicle of the Sundance Film Festival.

Acura also has a 'Mobility Program' that ensures drivers who are disabled are safe in their vehicles. The program offers cash reimbursement towards the cost of adaptive equipment for disabled drivers.

Acura was the official shirt sponsor of the Columbus Crew from 2017 to 2020.

Current models

 2000–present MDX (mid-size crossover SUV)
 2006–present RDX (compact crossover SUV)
 1985–2001, 2022–present Integra (compact liftback sedan, replaces ILX)
 2014–present TLX (Executive sedan, replaces TL and TSX)

Discontinued models
 2014–2020 RLX (Mid-size luxury executive sedan, replaces RL)
 2009–2013 ZDX (crossover SUV, discontinued for 2014 model year due to low sales and a $50,000 pricetag)
 2005–2011 CSX (compact sedan, replacement for the EL; only available in Canada, replaced by the ILX)
 2003–2014 TSX (compact sports sedan, sport wagon, replaced by the TLX)
 2002–2006 RSX (sports coupe, replacement for third generation Integra, replaced by the TSX)
 1997–2005 EL (compact sedan, replaced Integra sedan; only available in Canada, replaced by the CSX)
 1997–1999, 2001–2003 CL (luxury coupe, discontinued after 2003 model year)
 1996–2014 TL (mid-size sports sedan, replaced by the TLX)
 1996–2012 RL (full-size sedan, discontinued after 2012 model year, replaced by the RLX)
 1996–1999 SLX (SUV, rebadged Isuzu Trooper, replaced by the MDX; only available in the United States)
 1992–1994 Vigor (mid-sized sedan, replaced by the TL)
 1985–1995 Legend (luxury sedan and coupe, renamed RL for 1996 model year)
 1991–2005, 2017–2022 NSX (Exotic sports car)
 2013–2022 ILX (Compact executive sedan, successor to the CSX and Integra)
 2017–2022 CDX (sub-compact Luxury CUV, only available in China)

US sales

See also
 Honda

References

External links

 Acura USA
 Acura Canada
 Acura Newsroom

 
Honda
Automotive companies based in Tokyo
Car brands
Car manufacturers of Japan
Luxury motor vehicle manufacturers
Vehicle manufacturing companies established in 1986
Japanese brands